The Church of the Santissima Annunziata dei Catalani is a church in Messina, Sicily Italy. It is an example of Norman architecture in Sicily.

The church dates from the 12th century, when Sicily was under Norman rule. Built on top of the ruins of an older temple dedicated to Neptune, the church is an example of Sicilian Norman architecture with its  mix of different cultural elements. The church displays influences from Arab and Byzantine architecture and also contains Roman elements. Particularly the apse is unusually well-preserved. Previously known as "Annunziata di Castellammare" on account of its proximity to an homonymous medieval fortress which guarded the inlet of the port and shipyard, its later established name derives from merchants from Catalonia who established a presence in Messina in the 16th century.

It is one of the few structures to have survived the catastrophic earthquake in 1908 which destroyed most of Messina. As a result of the earthquake the church is situated 3 metres below the reconstructed street level.

See also
 Norman-Arab-Byzantine culture

References

External links

Norman architecture in Italy
Churches with Norman architecture
Roman Catholic churches in Messina